Stephan Breuing (born 21 September 1985, in Bochum) is a German sprint canoer who has competed since 2005. He won two medals in the C-4 1000 m event at the ICF Canoe Sprint World Championships with a gold in 2006 and a bronze in 2005.

References

Official website 

1985 births
German male canoeists
Living people
ICF Canoe Sprint World Championships medalists in Canadian
Sportspeople from Bochum